Two Friends is a 2015 French romantic dramedy film directed by Louis Garrel in his feature debut, and co-written by Garrel and Christophe Honoré. The film is loosely based on the play The Moods of Marianne by Alfred de Musset. It was selected to screen in the International Critics' Week section at the 2015 Cannes Film Festival.

Plot 
Mona, a prisoner on work release, meets Clément, a shy actor. Desperate to impress Mona, Clément recruits his extroverted friend, Abel, to help. When Mona becomes more interested in Abel, it sets off a conflict between the two friends. Meanwhile, Mona attempts to keep her past hidden.

Cast 
 Golshifteh Farahani as Mona
 Vincent Macaigne as Clément
 Louis Garrel as Abel
 Mahaut Adam as Colette
 Pierre Maillet as Le réceptionniste hôtel
 Rhizlaine El Cohen as La gérante
 Aymeline Valade as La femme station-service

Release 
The film had its world premiere at the Cannes Film Festival, during the International Critics' Week, on 18 May 2015. It was nominated for two awards, including the Golden Camera award. It was first released in French theaters on 23 September 2015.

Reception

Box office 
Two Friends grossed $0 in North America and $125,812 worldwide, against a production budget of about $3.3 million.

Critical response 
On French review aggregator AlloCiné, the film holds an average rating of 3.6 out of 5, based on 18 critic's reviews. Peter Debruge of Variety wrote that the film captures "a sense of genuine emotion many directors never accomplish in their entire careers". Jordan Mintzer of The Hollywood Reporter called it "a charming if not entirely convincing feature debut".

Jonathan Romney at Screen Daily says it was "Elegantly shot, the whole thing nevertheless seems at once thin and over-cooked: Philippe Sarde's lush orchestral score feels excess to requirements, given the intimate, ultimately claustrophobic scale of the drama."

Mubi writes, "The latest filmmaker in the Garrel dynasty, Philippe’s son Louis picks up the camera for this, his debut feature as writer-director. Co-written with his regular collaborator Christophe Honoré, Two Friends is a terrific 21st-century spin on the classic—and yes, French—love-triangle drama."

Accolades

References

External links 
 
 
 

2010s buddy comedy-drama films
2015 drama films
2015 directorial debut films
2015 films
2015 romantic comedy-drama films
French buddy comedy-drama films
French romantic comedy-drama films
2010s French-language films
French films based on plays
Films based on works by Alfred de Musset
Films directed by Louis Garrel
Films scored by Philippe Sarde
2010s French films